Volodymyr Ordynskyi (born 12 April 1985, in Yablunivka, Bila Tserkva Raion, Kyiv Oblast, Ukrainian SSR) is a Ukrainian football striker.

Career

Ordynskyi is a product of his native Bila Tserkva Raion's youth sportive school system. His first trainer was Valeriy Pozdnyakov. During his career Ordynskyi played both, in the Ukrainian lower Leagues, and in the other football clubs.

In January 2017 he signed contract with Cambodian Phnom Penh Crown FC and made two appearances in 2017 AFC Cup play-off round against Home United from Singapore.

References

External links

1985 births
Living people
Ukrainian footballers
Ukrainian expatriate footballers
FC Ros Bila Tserkva players
FC Arsenal-Kyivshchyna Bila Tserkva players
MFC Mykolaiv players
FC Kolos Kovalivka players
FC Gagra players
FK Dečić players
FK Radnički Berane players
Expatriate footballers in Cambodia
Expatriate footballers in Montenegro
Expatriate footballers in Georgia (country)
Ukrainian expatriate sportspeople in Georgia (country)
Phnom Penh Crown FC players
Association football forwards
Sportspeople from Kyiv Oblast